The 35th New Brunswick Legislative Assembly represented New Brunswick between March 17, 1921, and July 17, 1925.

William Pugsley served as Lieutenant-Governor of New Brunswick in 1921. He was succeeded by William Frederick Todd in 1923.

Allison Dysart was chosen as speaker.

The Liberal Party led by Walter Edward Foster partnered with members of the United Farmers to form the first minority government in the province's history. Peter Veniot succeeded Foster in 1923.

History

Members 

Notes:

References 
 Canadian Parliamentary Guide, 1925, AL Normandin

Terms of the New Brunswick Legislature
1921 establishments in New Brunswick
1925 disestablishments in New Brunswick
20th century in New Brunswick